Deputy Surgeon-General John Small (28 January 1823 – July 1879) was a British Army officer, physician, and early advocate for the use of large doses of quinine to treat malaria.

Early life 
Small was born in Edinburgh, Scotland, the oldest son of Patrick Small and Mary Brown Small. His father was a silversmith, jeweller and auctioneer on Edinburgh's Advocate's Close. Small and his family were members of the Smalls of Dirnanean.

Career 
Small began his medical career as an apprentice under J. F. MacFarlan in the North Bridge section of Edinburgh. He later attended the University of Edinburgh and the extra-academical school. He received his medical licence from the Royal College of Surgeons of Edinburgh in 1843. After two years in private practice he entered the army in 1845. His first assignment was with the 12th Regiment of Foot at Mauritius. He was later reassigned to Africa to fight in the Cape Frontier Wars, for which he received a medal. He afterwards served as surgeon for the Cape Mounted Riflemen before returning to Mauritius as staff surgeon. He was promoted to surgeon-major on 30 December 1865. In 1867 Small co-authored the Report on the Malarial Epidemic Fever of Mauritius of 1866–67, in which large doses of quinine were advocated to treat malaria fever. Small was promoted to deputy surgeon-general in 1875 and placed in charge of medical services in the Woolwich district in London.

Death 
Small died at Woolwich  in July 1879. He was survived by his widow and one daughter.

References 

Alumni of the University of Edinburgh
Military personnel from Edinburgh
Royal Army Medical Corps officers
1823 births
1879 deaths